Gregory Andrew Joy (born April 23, 1956) is an American-born Canadian high jumper who stood 6' 4" tall and weighed 157 lbs while competing from 1973 to 1982 for Canada.

Biography
Born in the U.S. to Canadian parents, Joy lived in Vancouver, British Columbia, from age 9 to 17.

He won the silver medal in the high jump at the 1976 Summer Olympics in Montreal, being the highest medal earned by Canada, which became the first host country in summer Olympics history not to produce at least one gold medal winner and later was selected to carry Canada's flag at the closing ceremonies.

For his achievement, Joy was voted the winner of the Lionel Conacher Award as Canada's top male athlete of 1976 and the Norton Crowe Award as Canada's top male amateur athlete of the year.

Joy's final successful jump from those games would be part of CBC's nightly sign-off montage for decades.

He would later marry Sue Holloway, who won two canoe sprint medals at the 1984 Summer Olympics in Los Angeles and also competed in the 1976 Winter Olympics in cross-country skiing.

In 1995, he ran as a Progressive Conservative candidate in the riding of Ottawa West, in the 1995 provincial election, finishing second to Bob Chiarelli by 1,618 votes.

As of 2016, he was an adjudicator for the landlord and tenant board in Ottawa.

References

 Wallechinsky, David and Jaime Loucky (2008). "Track & Field (Men): High Jump". In The Complete Book of the Olympics: 2008 Edition. London: Aurum Press Limited. p. 203.

External links
 
 

1956 births
Athletes (track and field) at the 1976 Summer Olympics
Athletes (track and field) at the 1978 Commonwealth Games
Athletes (track and field) at the 1982 Commonwealth Games
Canadian sportsperson-politicians
Canadian male high jumpers
American people of Canadian descent
Olympic track and field athletes of Canada
Olympic silver medalists for Canada
Commonwealth Games silver medallists for Canada
Track and field athletes from Portland, Oregon
Athletes from Vancouver
Living people
Commonwealth Games medallists in athletics
Progressive Conservative Party of Ontario candidates in Ontario provincial elections
Medalists at the 1976 Summer Olympics
Olympic silver medalists in athletics (track and field)
Medallists at the 1978 Commonwealth Games